GUNNAR Optiks is a company founded in 2007 that specializes in treated eyewear, marketed as safety glasses that protect eyes from computer vision syndrome.  Gunnar eyewear has received considerable attention in technical media reviews, including PCWorld, Lifehacker, Huffington Post, and Gizmodo.

The company makes marketing claims that the eyewear improves contrast and comfort, while reducing eye fatigue and visual stress, especially for people who spend many hours staring at digital displays.

A Pacific University research study of 36 participants in 2007 found significant differences in irritation or burning of the eyes, tearing, or watery eyes, dry eyes, and tired eyes, that were each improved by Gunnar lenses versus placebo lenses, but in a follow-up study in 2008, the same team was not able to reproduce the results of the first study, finding no difference in burning of the eyes, tearing, or watery eyes with Gunnar Optiks compared to placebo glasses. This study found "[no] scientific evidence for a change in accommodation (focusing), tear volume, or electromyography of the eyelid (squinting and blinking)".

Gunnar Optiks, represented by co-founder Joe Croft, appeared on the February 11, 2018, episode of the ABC television program Shark Tank.

References

Eyewear brands of the United States
Eyewear retailers of the United States
American companies established in 2007
Manufacturing companies established in 2007
Retail companies established in 2007
Companies based in San Diego County, California
Manufacturing companies of the United States
Eyewear companies of the United States